Napps was a cricket ground at Wrotham in Kent. One match played on the ground was given retrospective first-class cricket status. This took place in 1815, when a Kent side played host to an England XI. The only other recorded match at this venue was played the following year between a Kent XI and Wrotham.

References

1815 establishments in England
Cricket grounds in Kent
Defunct cricket grounds in England
Defunct sports venues in Kent
English cricket venues in the 18th century
History of Kent
Sports venues completed in 1815